Mafia is one of the 6 districts of the Pwani Region of Tanzania.  It covers Mafia Island and its associated archipelago. 

According to the 2012 Tanzania National Census, the population of the District was 46,438,  with an adult literacy rate of 77.3%, primarily only in Swahili.  In 2012, unemployment in Mafia District was 1.5%.

In addition to Mafia Island, islands within Mafia District include: Juani, Chole, Jibondo (Kibondo), Bwejuu (with Mafia Island Marine Park), Thanda, Boydu, and Niororo (Nyororo).

Wards
The Mafia District is administratively divided into eight wards, and twenty villages.  Prior to 2010, Mafia District had seven wards, when Ndagoni Ward was created from the western part of Baleni Ward.The wards listed with area and population:

Notes and references

Districts of Pwani Region